Nima Denzongpa is an Indian Hindi language social drama series that aired on Colors TV from 23 August 2021 to 2 September 2022. It starred Surabhi Das, Mohammed Iqbal Khan, Manish Raisinghan and Akshay Kelkar.

Plot 
Nima Denzongpa is a young, kind-hearted and innocent girl from Sikkim. Suresh Mane, a young spot boy from Mumbai, comes to Sikkim for a shoot with his manager. Eventually, Nima and Suresh fall in love and form a tight bond. A day before leaving, Suresh asks Nima to come with him to Mumbai, leaving Nima in dilemma. Nima's mother learns the truth and tells her to do what she feels is right. Nima chooses to love and goes to Mumbai, where she faces many insults. Suresh's mother, Sunita has fixed a relationship for him. But, Suresh managed to marry Nima in court. Later, Sunita pretends to accept Nima to save her reputation.

6 years later
Nima is shown to be a mother of two daughters, Siya and Manya. Sunita doesn't want a girl child and fixes Suresh's marriage with a Marathi girl Tulika. But on the engagement, it is revealed that Nima is pregnant with her third child. Suresh managed to take some time from Sunita and Tulika. He agrees to marry Tulika only if Nima's child would not a boy.

Nima gives birth to her third daughter, Naari. She is left alone with her daughters. Tulika and Suresh are married as per the deal. Tulika and Sunita create many difficulties for Nima. Soon, Tulika and Suresh have a son, Varun. Tulika fakes Varun's kidnapping with Sunita's help. Suresh angrily throws Nima out of the house. Nima gets a job at a tea stall. However, Manya is lost but is rescued and returned to Nima by a rich family named Goenka. Soon, Nima gets a job as a maid at Goenkas and buys a home in Suresh's neighbourhood. Sarla, Nima's friend helps her with the house arrangements. Meanwhile, Suresh decides to divorce Nima tired of quarrels with Tulika and Sunita. Nima too agrees and they parted ways.

20 years later
Siya, Manya and Naari have grown up. Tulika, Varun and Sunita are jealous of seeing Nima and her daughters' success. Siya gets a job in a bank where she meets Shiv. Soon they both become friends. Manya aspires to be a model and Naari is studying at a college. Manya is kidnapped but rescued by Paras Goenka, who is later revealed to be the son of the Goenka family where Nima works. He offers Manya a job. Suresh gets a driving job at Goenkas'.

Eventually, Shiv-Siya and Paras-Manya fall in love. Shiv is forced to marry Kanchan, leaving Siya heartbroken. Tulika throws Suresh and Sunita out of the house. Nima shelters them making Sunita realize her value. Meanwhile, Goenkas forces Paras to marry Mitali. Nima, Suman and Babita learn about Paras' relationship and help him, unaware that it's Manya. Paras runs away from the wedding and marries Manya in the temple. However, Manya is revealed to be pregnant and Goenkas' have to accept her. Thus, Manya and Paras get married. Tulika realizes her mistakes and moves with Suresh. 

Later, Nima takes care of Virat's son, Krish. After some days Virat's family returns. On Krish's request, Nima and Virat marry. Nima tells the truth to her family about marrying Virat. Virat's fiancée, Priyal and sister-in-law, Mona try to create problems between Krish, Virat and Nima, but in vain. Manya meets with an accident and miscarries due to Priyal. Sia marries Shiv after he divorced Kanchan.

Virat's brother, Alok, who is jealous of him, fakes his death and frames Virat, who goes missing. Suresh and Tulika return and help Nima to expose Alok, who is arrested. Later, Nima finds Virat, who has lost his memory and lives as Manav Deshmukh. He lives with a woman named Sujata, who claims as his wife. Eventually, Virat regains his memory. Sujata is revealed to be a serial killer and holds Virat captive. Nima saves Virat from her, risking her life and gets Sujata arrested. Finally, Nima and Virat reunite to live happily.

Cast

Main
 Surabhi Das as Nima Denzongpa Sethi – Suresh's ex-wife; Virat's wife; Siya, Manya and Naari's mother; Goenka's ex-maid; Krish's care-taker and adoptive mother. (2021–2022)
 Akshay Kelkar as Suresh Mane – Sunita's son; Nima's ex-husband; Tulika's husband; Siya, Manya, Naari and Varun's father; Goenka's ex-driver. (2021–2022)
 Mohammed Iqbal Khan / Manish Raisinghan as 
Virat Sethi / Fake Manav Deshmukh – Gulshan's younger son; Alok's brother; Nima's boss turned husband; Krish's adoptive father (2022) 
 Roy Kumar – Virat's look-alike; An actor; Priyal's lover (2022)

Recurring
 Usha Naik as Sunita Mane – Suresh's mother; Siya, Manya, Naari and Varun's grandmother. (2021-2022)
 Sharmila Shinde as Tulika Mane – Shankar's daughter; Suresh's second wife; Varun's mother. (2021–2022)
 Sushmita Singh as Siya Mane – Suresh and Nima's eldest daughter; Manya and Naari's sister; Varun's half-sister; Shiv's wife. (2021–2022)
 Asmi Deo as Child Siya Mane (2021)
 Sonakshi Batra as Manya Mane Goenka – Suresh and Nima's second daughter; Siya and Naari's sister; Varun's half-sister; Paras's wife. (2021–2022)
 Ravya Sadhwani as Child Manya Mane (2021)
 Sukanya Barua as Naari Mane – Suresh and Nima's youngest daughter; Siya and Manya's sister; Varun's half-sister. (2021–2022)
 Unknown as Baby Naari Mane (2021)
 Sneh Mirani as Varun Mane – Suresh and Tulika's son; Siya, Manya and Naari's half-brother. (2021–2022)
 Unknown as Baby Varun Mane (2021)
 Subhan Khan as Krish Sethi – Virat and Nima's adopted son (2022) 
 Prabhat Chaudhary / Raghav Thakur as Paras Goenka – Suman and Dinesh's son; Babita's brother; Manya's husband (2021–2022)
 Veer Bhanushali as Child Paras Goenka (2021)
 Chitransh Raj as Shiv – Kanchan's ex-husband; Siya's husband (2021–2022)
 Salman Shaikh as Mayank – Kanchan's ex-fiancé. (2022) 
 Himani Sharma as Priyal – Mona's sister; Virat's ex-fiancé (2022)
 Pallavi Rao as Mona Sethi – Priyal's sister; Alok's wife; Simmi's mother (2022)
 Shiv Mishra as Alok Sethi – Gulshan's elder son; Virat's brother; Mona's husband; Simmi's father (2022)
 Palak Jain as Simmi Sethi – Alok and Mona's daughter (2022)
 Daljeet Soundh as Gulshan Sethi – Ashok and Virat's mother; Simmi's grandmother; Krish's adoptive grandmother (2022)
 Chaitrali Rode as Sarla – Nima's friend and well-wisher. (2021–2022)
 Abhishek Mohan Gaikwad as Shankar – Tulika's father; Varun's grandfather. (2021–2022)
 Shweta Gautam as Suman Goenka – Dinesh's wife; Paras and Babita's mother. (2021–2022)
 Hetal Puniwala as Dinesh Goenka – Pushpa's son; Suman's husband; Paras and Babita's father. (2021–2022)
 Bhairavi Vaidya as Pushpa Goenka – Dinesh's mother; Paras and Babita's grandmother. (2021–2022)
 Nishi Saxena as Babita Goenka – Suman and Dinesh's daughter; Paras's sister. (2021–2022)
 Aria Sakaria as Child Babita Goenka (2021)
 Rohit Kumar as Hemal – Paras's childhood friend. (2021)
 Deepak Verma as Baaky – Male servant at Goenka house. (2021)
 Prakriti Patel as Kanchan – Shiv's ex-wife; Mayank's ex-fiancée (2021)
 Gargi Tripathi as Rani Goenka – Dinesh's aunt; Paras and Babita's grandaunt. (2021–2022)
 Prashant Poojari as Bhola – Ranisa's guardian (2021)
 Akshita Singh Rajput as Mitali Bansal – Paras's ex-fiancée. (2021)
 Dinesh Vadhva as Salman – Varun's friend (2021)
 Chandrahas Pandey as Gopal – Suresh's friend (2021)
 Kailash Topnani as Raman – Manya's friend (2021)
 Sunita Rajwar as Mrs. Denzongpa – Nima's mother (2021)
 Supriya Pawar as Sujata – Virat's fake wife (2022)
 Anjali Ujawane as Sarita (2022)
 Saahitya Pansare as Tushar (2022)

References

External links 

Colors TV original programming
2021 Indian television series debuts
2020s Indian television series